Isobenzan (telodrin) is a highly toxic organochloride insecticide.  It was produced only in the period from 1958 to 1965 and its use has been since discontinued.  It is a persistent organic pollutant that can remain in soil for 2 to 7 years, and the biological half-life of isobenzan in human blood is estimated to be about 2.8 years.

It is classified as an extremely hazardous substance in the United States as defined in Section 302 of the U.S. Emergency Planning and Community Right-to-Know Act (42 U.S.C. 11002), and is subject to strict reporting requirements by facilities which produce, store, or use it in significant quantities.

References

Organochloride insecticides
Isobenzofurans